Darius (floruit 425–437) was a politician of the Eastern Roman Empire.

Darius was a Praetorian prefect of the East. He is attested in office between 28 August 436, when the law preserved in Codex Theodosianus XI 1.37a was addressed to him, to 16 March 437, the day in which another law, preserved in Codex Theodosianus VI 23.4a, was addressed to him.

He might have been in office until October 437; in that case, he was in Constantinople and received a copy of the not-yet published Codex Theodosianus.

Darius is to be identified with the Praetorian prefect "Damarius", whose wife Aeliana had a vision in 425, in Constantinople.

Sources 
 Arnold Hugh Martin Jones, John Robert Martindale, John Morris, "Darius 3", Prosopography of the Later Roman Empire, Cambridge University Press, 1971, p. 348.

5th-century Byzantine people
Praetorian prefects of the East